The men's 5000 metres at the 2007 World Championships in Athletics was held at the Nagai Stadium on 30 August and 2 September.

Medalists

Records
Prior to the competition, the following records were as follows.

Schedule

Results

Heats
Qualification: First 5 in each heat (Q) and the next 5 fastest (q) advance to the final.

Final

References
General
Results
Specific

5000 metres
5000 metres at the World Athletics Championships